Glowing Eyes (alternative title: Porn Theatre) is a 2002 French drama film directed by and starring Jacques Nolot. It was screened in the Un Certain Regard section at the 2002 Cannes Film Festival. The film has been cited as a favorite by filmmaker John Waters, who presented it as his annual selection within the 2005 Maryland Film Festival.

Plot
In a decrepit Parisian porn film theatre, a fifty-year-old man and a young projectionist begin a tentative relationship, observed by the world-weary Italian-born cashier at the ticket booth.

Cast
 Vittoria Scognamiglio - Cashier
 Jacques Nolot - 50-Year-Old Man
 Sébastien Viala - Projectionist
 Olivier Torres - L'homme à la robe jaune
 Lionel Goldstein - L'homme à l'imper noir
 Frédéric Longbois - L'homme à l'éventail
 Fouad Zeraoui - L'homme qui a cu sa dose
 Jean-Louis Coquery - L'homme nu
 Raphaëline Goupilleau - SDF...
 Pascal Varley - SDF...
 Arben Bajraktaraj - SDF...
 Christine Paolini - Fliquette
 Matt Trahan - Flic 1
 Mark Duran - Flic 2 (as Marc Durant)
 Frédéric Franzil - Gigolo
 Dominique Daguier - L'homme battu

References

External links

2002 films
2002 drama films
French drama films
2000s French-language films
Films directed by Jacques Nolot
New French Extremity films
2000s French films